The 1924-25 French Rugby Union Championship was won by the US Perpignan that defeated the Carcassonne in the final.

The Championship was contested by 30 teams divided in 6 pools of 5.

The championship of "première série", was now called "excellence", the second division become "honneur".

Seven new clubs make their debut in "Excellence" : Angoulême, Stade Bagnères, Boucau, Limoges, Mazamet (champion of second division 1924), Arlequins Perpignan and La Teste.

They replaced: Biarritz, SBUC, Chalon, Lézignan, Lourdes, Olympique du Paris and Poitiers.

First round

(3 point for victory, 2 for draw, 1 for defeat, 0 in case of forfait)

In bold'' the teams qualified for next round

 Pool A 
 Toulouse 11 pts
 Stade Français 10 pts
 Arlequins Perpignan 9 pts
 Hendaye 5 pts
 Agen 5 pts
 Pool B 
 SA Bordeaux 10 pts
 US Perpignan 9 pts
 Toulouse Olimpyque EC 8 pts
 Pau 7 pts
 Périgueux 7 pts
 Pool C 
 Stadoceste 10 pts
 Albi 9 pts
 AS Bayonne 8 pts,
 Toulon8 pts
 La Teste 4 pts
 Pool D 
 Grenoble 12 pts, 
  Mazamet 8 pts, 
 Stade Bagnères 8 pts, 
 Béziers 8 pts
 Soustons 4 pts
  Tie-Break:  Mazamet - Stade Bagnères 9 a 0
 Pool E : 
 Carcassonne 10 pts
 Bayonne 10 pts
 Begles 10 pts
 Angoulême 6 pts
  Limoges 4 pts
  Tie-Break:  Bayonne - Bègles 3 a 0
 Pool F 
 Narbonne 12 pts, Racing 10 ptsSO Avignon 7 pts, Boucau 6 pts, Cognac 6 pts

 Quarter of finals 
(3 point for victory, 2 for draw, 1 for defeat, 0 in case of forfait)

 Pool A  
 Toulouse 6 pts,
 Bayonne 4 pts
 Racing 2 pts
 Pool B Stadoceste 5 pts
 US Perpignan 5 pts
 Stade Français 2 pts
 Tie-Break : US Perpignan – Stadoceste  5 - 3
 Pool C 
 Narbonne 6 pts
 Albi 4 pts
 Grenoble 2 pts
 Pool D 
 Carcassonne''' 6 pts
 Mazamet 3 pts
 SA Bordeaux 3 pts

Semifinals

Final 
The US Perpignan beat AS Carcassonnaise 5 - 0 (after un first match tied 0-0, on 26 April 1925 at Toulouse, Stade des Ponts-Jumeaux).

Other competitions

The 19 April 1925, in Bordeaux, the Montferrand beat Biarritz in the final of the "Championnat de France Honneur" (2° division) for 14 - 6

In Third division Cercle Athlétique d'Esperaza beat in the final Cheminots de Béziers 25 - 0

Sources 
 L'Humanité, 1925
 Compte rendu de la finale de 1925, sur lnr.fr
 Information sur first final, sur finalesrugby.com

1925
1924–25 rugby union tournaments for clubs
Championship